The Sheriff of Argyll was historically a royal officer charged with enforcing the king's rights in Argyll; in Scotland, the concept of sheriff gradually evolved into a judicial position.

Originally, the region of Argyll was served by the sheriff of Perth, however in 1326, king Robert I appointed his step-nephew-in-law, Dougal Campbell, to the newly created position of sheriff of Argyll; Dougall was the son of Neil Campbell, whose second wife was Robert's sister, Mary. The traditional stronghold of the Campbells was in the centre of the Argyll region, and Robert had wished to reward the Campbells for their service in his successful usurpation of king John Balliol.

Though named sheriff of Argyll the position was initially limited to Lorn, but expanded in later centuries. In 1633, the sheriff of Argyll newly acquired authority over Kintyre and Knapdale, which had previously been under the sheriff of Tarbert.

Prior to 1748 most sheriffdoms were held on a hereditary basis. From that date, following the Jacobite uprising of 1745, the hereditary sheriffs were replaced by salaried sheriff-deputes, qualified advocates who were members of the Scottish Bar. The post of sheriff of Argyll continued in existence until 1948, when it was amalgamated with the sheriffdom of Renfrew to form the position of Sheriff of Renfrew and Argyll.

Sheriffs of Argyll 

 Dugal Campbell (12??– )
 Alasdair MacDubhgaill, Lord of Lorne, 1293–????
 Dugal Campbell (1326)
 Gillespie Campbell (1373)
 Eóin MacDubhgaill (???)
 Colin Campbell, 1st Earl of Argyll (1468)
 George Campbell 1636-1655 
 Archibald Campbell, 9th Earl of Argyll  (died 1685) 
 James Stuart 1686– 
 Colin Campbell, 1691-1710 
 Archibald Campbell of Danna, 1714-1748 based on above referenced Clan Campbell entries.
 John Campbell of Danna, 1748-???? son of Archibald, as referenced in above Clan Campbell entries.

Sheriffs-Depute
 Charles Stewart, 1746-1757? Bonnie Prince Charlie's purse bearer at Battle of Culloden.
 Archibald Campbell of Stonefield, –1776 
 Robert Campbell of Asknish, 1776– >1808
 Donald MacLachlan, –1817 
 Sir Humphrey Trafford Campbell, 1817–1818 
 Robert Bruce, 1818–>1843 
 George Campbell, Duke of Argyll, 1847–????
 Edward Francis Maitland, 1851–1855 
 Thomas Cleghorn, 1855–1874 
 Alexander Forbes Irvine, 1874–1891
 D. Mackechnie, 1892–1898
 James Ferguson, 1898–1905
 Alexander Logan M'Clure, 1905–1920 (Sheriff of Aberdeen, 1920–1932)
 Andrew Henderson Briggs Constable, KC, 1920–1920
 John Lean Wark, 1920–1933 
 John Robert Dickson, KC, 1933–1937 
 Charles Mackintosh, KC, 1937–1942  (Sheriff of Inverness, Elgin & Nairn, 1942) 
 James Frederick Strachan, KC, 1942–1945 (Sheriff of Perth and Angus, 1945)
 Thomas Murray-Taylor, KC, 1945–1946  (Sheriff of Renfrew and Argyll, 1946–1948)
For sheriffs after 1946 see Sheriff of Renfrew and Argyll

See also
 Historical development of Scottish sheriffdoms

References

Argyll
Argyll and Bute
14th-century establishments in Scotland
1948 disestablishments in Scotland